The Kingdom of Dhurkot was a petty kingdom in the confederation of 24 states known as Chaubisi Rajya. The Kingdom of Palpa supported Bahadur Shah of Nepal who annexed Dhurkot and in return, Palpa kings were given various item including 101 elephants, 1,001 horses, and money.

References 

Chaubisi Rajya
Dhurkot
Dhurkot
History of Nepal
Dhurkot